Phone Booth is a 2002 American psychological thriller film directed by Joel Schumacher, produced by David Zucker and Gil Netter, written by Larry Cohen and starring Colin Farrell, Forest Whitaker, Katie Holmes, Radha Mitchell, and Kiefer Sutherland. In the film, a malevolent hidden sniper calls a phone booth, and when a young publicist inside answers the phone, he quickly finds his life is at risk. The film received generally positive reviews from critics and was a box office hit, grossing $97 million worldwide against a production budget of $13 million.

The film was premiered at the 2002 Toronto International Film Festival, and was set to be theatrically released in November 2002, but the D.C. sniper attacks in October 2002 prompted 20th Century Fox to delay the release of the film, and it opened in the United States on April 4, 2003.

Plot

Stuart Shepard is an arrogant and dishonest New York City publicist who has been having an affair with Pamela McFadden behind the back of his wife Kelly. While in Times Square, Stuart uses a public phone booth to contact Pam, allowing him to avoid detection by Kelly. During the call, he is interrupted by a pizza delivery man who attempts to deliver a free pizza to him, but Stuart aggressively turns him away. As soon as Stuart completes his call, the phone rings. Stuart answers; a man on the other end, who knows his name, warns him not to leave the booth, threatening to tell Kelly about Pam.

The caller tells Stuart that he has tested two previous individuals who have done wrong deeds in a similar manner, giving each a chance to reveal the truth to those they wronged, but in both cases they refused and were killed. Stuart must confess his feelings to both Kelly and Pam to avoid the same fate. To demonstrate the threat, the caller fires a suppressed sniper rifle with pinpoint accuracy. The caller then contacts Pam and connects her to Stuart, who admits that he is married.

The booth is approached by three sex workers demanding to use the phone, but Stuart refuses to leave, without revealing his dilemma. Leon, a pimp, breaks the glass side of the booth, grabs Stuart and pummels him while the sex workers cheer. The caller offers to "make him stop" and in Stuart's confusion, he inadvertently asks for this; the caller shoots Leon dead. The sex workers immediately blame Stuart, accusing him of having a gun, as the police and news crews converge on the location.

NYPD Captain Ed Ramey seals off the area and negotiates to make Stuart leave the booth, but he refuses. Stuart tells the caller that there is no way they can incriminate him, but the caller draws his attention to a handgun planted in the roof of the phone booth. As Kelly and Pam both arrive on the scene, the caller demands that Stuart tell Kelly the truth, which he does. The caller then orders Stuart to choose between Kelly and Pam, and the woman he does not choose will be shot.

Stuart secretly uses his cell phone to call Kelly, allowing her to overhear his conversation with the caller; she quietly informs Ramey of this. Meanwhile, Stuart continues to confess to everyone that his whole life is a lie, to make himself look better than he really is. Stuart's confession provides sufficient distraction to allow the police to trace the payphone call to a nearby building. Stuart warns the caller that the police are on the way, and the caller replies that if he is caught, he will kill Kelly. Desperate, Stuart grabs the handgun and leaves the booth, begging for the sniper to kill him instead. The police fire upon Stuart, while a SWAT team breaks into the room that the caller was tracked to, only to find a rifle and a man's corpse.

Stuart regains consciousness; the police fired only rubber bullets, stunning but not harming him. Stuart and Kelly happily reconcile. As the police bring down the body, Stuart identifies it as the pizza delivery man from earlier. Stuart gets medical treatment at a local ambulance; as he does, the real caller passes by, warning Stuart that if his newfound honesty does not last, he will return, before disappearing into the crowd. Later, the pay phone rings and another man answers.

Cast
 Colin Farrell as Stuart "Stu" Shepard, a selfish and dishonest publicist who becomes a victim of a mysterious caller who threatens to kill him
 Kiefer Sutherland as The Caller, an unnamed, malevolent, but scheming killer and trained sniper, who calls Stu in the phone booth and holds him hostage
 Forest Whitaker as Captain Ed Ramey, a police captain who gives assistance to Stu in his conflict against The Caller, but suspects him as the killer
 Katie Holmes as Pamela  "Pam" McFadden, Stu's mistress
 Radha Mitchell as Kelly Shepard, Stu's wife
 Paula Jai Parker as Felicia
 Tia Texada as Asia
 John Enos III as Leon
 Richard T. Jones as Sergeant Jonah Cole
 Keith Nobbs as Adam
 Josh Pais as Mario
 Ben Foster as "Big Q" (uncredited)
 Jared Leto as Bobby (in a deleted scene)

Production

Development
In the 1960s, Larry Cohen pitched Alfred Hitchcock an idea for a film which took place in real time, entirely within the confines of a telephone booth. Hitchcock liked the idea, but the project did not move forward, because the two men were unable to devise a plot which explained why the action had to be restricted to the one location. Cohen recalled that Hitchcock would ask him if he had a solution to the problem when they periodically met over the following years, but was not until the late 1990s, some two decades after Hitchcock's death, when he came up with the answer of a sniper forcing the protagonist to remain within the phone booth, and was able to write a script.

Creative Artists Agency signed a contract with Cohen and the script appealed to several A-list actors, such as Tom Cruise, Will Smith, Mel Gibson, Robin Williams, Anthony Hopkins, and Nicolas Cage; directors placed in contention included Gibson, Steven Spielberg, the Hughes brothers, and Michael Bay. According to Cohen, Bay was removed from consideration after the first question he asked about the script was, "OK, how do we get this thing out of the damn telephone booth?" Eventually, Joel Schumacher, who had been considered early in development, was brought back on to direct the film. Jim Carrey was originally cast as Stu Shepard, but he dropped out. Schumacher said: "We were going to shoot it that summer and he was fitted for the suit. But I got a call from Jim one night and told me he had cold feet. He really didn't feel comfortable with it. Actors never give up their role. If an actor gives up a part then it's not right for them."

Filming

The principal photography on the film was completed in ten days, with an additional two days of establishing shots, pickups, and re-shoots. This accelerated filming schedule was aided by the adoption of French hours, a work schedule that skips the typical one-hour production shutdown for lunch break, in exchange for making food available all throughout the shooting day.

This was costume designer Daniel Orlandi's second feature with Joel Schumacher, having previously worked together on Flawless. According to him, Dolce & Gabbana created the suit and shirt worn by Colin Farrell. Though the fashion house was tasked with making additional suit copies for filming, they unfortunately would not arrive until the last day of shooting. Thankfully, the film was shot chronologically and thus the costume could sustain damage without slowing down production. Orlandi was able to keep one of the suit copies for himself as he and Farrell were the same size.

The film is set in real time, so the timespan in which the film takes place is as long as it takes to watch it, much like the television series 24, which also stars Kiefer Sutherland. Like 24, it also uses split screens. Although the film is set in New York City, it was filmed in front of what is now the CB1 Gallery in downtown Los Angeles, in November 2000. This is made evident by the LACMTA buses periodically driving by. The exact location of the phone booth in the film is the corner of West 5th Street and Frank Court, given away by the black gate in the background.

Release

Theatrical
The film premiered on September 10, 2002, at the Toronto International Film Festival. It was originally due to be released in the United States on November 15 of that year. However, in October 2002, the Beltway sniper attacks occurred in the Washington, D.C., area, prompting 20th Century Fox to delay the release of the film to April 5, 2003.

Home media
It was released on VHS and DVD on July 8, 2003.

Reception

Box office
The film grossed $46.5 million in the United States and $51.3 million internationally for a total gross of $97.8 million, from a $13 million production budget.

Critical response
On Rotten Tomatoes, the film has an approval rating of 72% based on 188 reviews, with an average rating of 6.5/10. The website's critical consensus reads: "Quick pacing and Farrell's performance help make Phone Booth a tense nail-biter." At Metacritic, the film has a  weighted average score of 56 out of 100 based on 35 critics, indicating "mixed or average reviews". Audiences surveyed by CinemaScore gave the film an average grade of "C+" on scale of A+ to F.

Roger Ebert of the Chicago Sun-Times gave the film three out of four stars, and said of Sutherland's performance, "if the voice doesn't work, neither does the movie. It does." Todd McCarthy of Variety magazine criticized the film for not having enough material even for its relatively short length, and wrote: "Gussied up with a host of filmmaking tricks in an attempt to keep things lively, this intensely acted little exercise just doesn't have enough going for it, with the exception of gradually growing interest in lead Colin Farrell."

Adaptation
A stage adaptation of the film was performed June 7–22, 2019, at PULP Black Box theatre in Atlanta.

See also
 The Jeopardy Room (The Twilight Zone)
 Liberty Stands Still (also a 2002 film), starring Wesley Snipes and Linda Fiorentino, that shares similar plot and theme
 Knock Out (2010 film), an unauthorized Bollywood remake of Phone Booth
 Locke (2013 film)

References

External links

 
 

2002 films
2002 psychological thriller films
2000s English-language films
2000s vigilante films
20th Century Fox films
American neo-noir films
American psychological thriller films
American vigilante films
Films about adultery in the United States
Films about atonement
Films about mass media people
Films about snipers
Films about stalking
Films adapted into plays
Films directed by Joel Schumacher
Films scored by Harry Gregson-Williams
Films set in Manhattan
Films shot in Los Angeles
Films with screenplays by Larry Cohen
Films about telephony
2000s American films